Rostellularia adscendens is an Australian plant species in the family Acanthaceae. It grows to between  10 and 50 cm high.

It occurs along streams or in rocky areas in woodland in Western Australia, the Northern Territory, South Australia, New South Wales and Queensland.
The taxon was first formally described by botanist Robert Brown in 1810 in Prodromus Florae Novae Hollandiae. He gave it the name Justicia adscendens. The species was transferred to the genus Rostellularia in 1986.

Subspecies and varieties include
 Rostellularia adscendens (R.Br.) R.M.Barker var. adscendens  
 Rostellularia adscendens var. clementii (Domin) R.M.Barker
 Rostellularia adscendens subsp. dallachyi R.M.Barker
 Rostellularia adscendens subsp. glaucoviolacea (Domin) R.M.Barker   
 Rostellularia adscendens var. hispida (Domin) R.M.Barker  
 Rostellularia adscendens var. juncea (R.Br.) R.M.Barker 
 Rostellularia adscendens var. largiflorens R.M.Barker   
 Rostellularia adscendens var. latifolia (Domin) R.M.Barker
 Rostellularia adscendens var. pogonanthera (F.Muell.) R.M.Barker

References

Acanthaceae
Flora of New South Wales
Flora of the Northern Territory
Flora of Queensland
Flora of South Australia
Eudicots of Western Australia
Taxa named by Robert Brown (botanist, born 1773)